Paul Thalheimer (born 1884 in Heilbronn - died 1948) was a German painter and graphic designer who was best known for his Christian motifs.

He studied art at the academies of Stuttgart and München, and settled down in München (1908) for most of his life. He was part of the Munich Secession and was a leading figure, in addition to taking part in exhibitions.

After the First World War he found many projects in church restoration, making coloured woodcuts based on Old Testament topics. He was named Professor in 1928 - and a degenerate artist in 1937.

He is perhaps most famous for St. Karl's Church in Nürnberg. There he used a thin paint containing casein to keep the structure of the stone in the walls, at the same time as allowing his figures to be identifiable.

References

1884 births
1948 deaths
People from Heilbronn
20th-century German painters
20th-century German male artists
German male painters